Jack Reese Carl was an American football, basketball, and track coach. He served as the head football coach at Hanover College in Hanover, Indiana from 1947 to 1948 and at his alma mater, Denison University in Granville, Ohio, from 1949 to 1953, compiling a career college football record of 37–19–1. Carlwas also the head basketball coach at Hanover from 1947 to 1949, tallying a mark of 23–21.

Carl lettered in football, baseball, and track at Denison before graduating in 1941. He began that fall in East Palestine, Ohio, where he was and assistant football coach at East Palestine High School and taught physical education and coached basketball at the East Palestine's junior high school. He entered the United States Navy and spent 32 months overseas during World War II as a lieutenant. After the war, Carl coached the varsity "B" squad in football at basketball at Indiana University Bloomington, where he worked for a Master of Science degree in physical education. In April 1947, he was appoint head coach in football, basketball, and track at Hanover.

Carl resign from his post at Denison in March 1954 to enter private business in Norwalk, Ohio. He was replaced as head football coach by Keith W. Piper, who was worked as Carl's line coach for three seasons.

Head coaching record

College football

References

Year of birth missing
Year of death missing
Denison Big Red baseball players
Denison Big Red football coaches
Denison Big Red football players
Hanover Panthers football coaches
Hanover Panthers men's basketball coaches
Indiana Hoosiers football coaches
Indiana Hoosiers men's basketball coaches
College men's track and field athletes in the United States
College track and field coaches in the United States
High school football coaches in Ohio
Indiana University Bloomington alumni
United States Navy personnel of World War II
United States Navy officers